Vassacyon ("wasatchian dog") is an extinct genus of placental mammals from clade Carnivoraformes, that lived in North America and Europe from late Paleocene to early Eocene. It is considered the largest of the early Eocene mammals.

Phylogeny
The phylogenetic relationships of genus Vassacyon are shown in the following cladogram:

See also
 Mammal classification
 Carnivoraformes
 Miacidae

References

Eocene mammals of North America
Eocene mammals of Europe
Miacids
Prehistoric placental genera
†